Stereocaulon tomentosum is a species of snow lichen belonging to the family Stereocaulaceae.

Ecology
Stereocaulon tomentosum is a known host to the lichenicolous fungus species:

 Arthonia stereocaulina
 Catillaria stereocaulorum
 Endococcus nanellus
 Opegrapha stereocaulicola
 Polycoccum trypethelioides
 Stigmidium beringicum

References

Lichen species
Lichens described in 1825
Stereocaulaceae
Taxa named by Elias Magnus Fries